Undisputed III: Redemption is a 2010 American action film directed by Isaac Florentine and starring Scott Adkins, Mykel Shannon Jenkins, Mark Ivanir and Hristo Shopov. The third installment in the franchise started by the 2002 action film Undisputed, it takes place several years after the events of Undisputed II: Last Man Standing.

Plot

Years have passed since Yuri Boyka suffered a defeat and a broken knee at the hands of George "Iceman" Chambers. Humbled by his injury, he has relegated to becoming the prison janitor. Meanwhile, mob boss Gaga has expanded his prison tournament enterprise into an inter-prison tournament called the Prison Spetz Competition (PSC), which gathers the best prison fighters from around the globe to compete for a chance at a cleared record and early release. As Boyka hears the preliminaries taking place within the prison, as well as failing in his parole, he begins training privately to bring his knee back into fighting shape. Just after current champion Vladimir Sykov defeats his opponent in the final round of the prison's tournament, Boyka challenges him on the spot and swiftly defeats him, thus becoming the Russian representative for the PSC.

Boyka is transferred to Gorgon prison in the Republic of Georgia where he is joined by a diverse group of eight international prison fighters. Though the fighters are allowed one hour each day for training, they are still grouped into the general population for hard labor while Colombian fighter and local inmate Raul "Dolor" Quiñones is given private sparring sessions and a regimen of performance-enhancing drugs. During his stay, Boyka gets into odds with an American fighter Jericho "Turbo" Jones who is shown to be disrespectful, insubordinate, and a loudmouth. Boyka, Turbo, Dolor, and Brazilian fighter Rodrigo Silva advance to the second round of the tournament while the losing fighters are sent home, only to be shot dead by waiting guards.

The next day, Turbo starts a fight with Boyka before both men are thrown into solitary confinement. They are eventually released due to some manipulations by their managers Gaga and mafia don Gio Farnatti, who are old friends and rivals. Upon hearing of the prison's treatment of their fighters, the two mob bosses confront Warden Kuss, but PSC mastermind Rezo explains to them that the tournament has always been fixed to ensure the "highest profit at the lowest risk". He advises them to liquefy their assets and place their bets on Dolor to ensure their profit. Realizing that the loyalty to their fighters only extend to their payout, Gaga and Farnatti agree to this arrangement. Meanwhile, Boyka and Turbo slowly develop a trust in each other and focus their attention at beating Dolor in the tournament. They both start using the hard labor as part of their training. With Turbo's attitude eroding, he starts showing signs that his ego evolved from a highly disciplined past as a U.S. Marine. In addition to reciting, "Improvise, Adapt, Overcome" as part of his training, he recommends some holistic medicine for Boyka to soothe his knee.

In the semi-finals, Boyka defeats Silva by making him tap out to a triangle choke; he helps his opponent up and commends him for a good fight. Realizing that Boyka and Turbo are stronger than predicted, Rezo and Warden Kuss arrange to have the guards beat up Turbo to a bloody pulp. When the prisoners are taken for the next round of hard labor, Boyka tries to convince Turbo into escaping rather than face Dolor wounded. Knowing that Turbo used to be in the military, the plan is to escape to the forest where the security is lightest and survive long enough to eventually get in touch with the black market. Turbo initially disagrees, until another prisoner reveals that the losers are executed. Caught trying to break their chain, the two fight off the guards long enough to get a key. Freed, Turbo makes a run for the forest.

Boyka is returned to the prison where he is confronted by Rezo, Warden Kuss, and Gaga. Knowing he has lost all support, he commits himself to ruining their wagers by defeating Dolor in the newly improvised final round. Dolor takes an early lead with his exceptionally quick hand blocks and strikes, as well as exacerbating the problems with Boyka's weak knee by using a submission hold on it. Deprived of his kicking ability and agility, Boyka recovers first by relying on his endurance and pain tolerance, persevering past some devastating hits. It looks like the fight is over when he is kicked out of the ring, but when he catches a glimpse of the mop and bucket used for sopping up blood after the bouts, which bears a striking resemblance to the ones he used during his training, he returns into the ring before the ten-count. Remembering Turbo's mantra, "Improvise, Adapt, Overcome," he takes the blood-soaked pad off the mop and ties it around his knee. Forced to adapt, he begins using a new style mixing in elements of grappling, dirty boxing head-butts and elbows, wrestling, and wu-shu. Dolor, in a final moment of rage, breaks his shin against Boyka's knee block, ending the match.

Desperate and despondent, Farnatti confronts Warden Kuss and shoots Rezo over the money that he's lost before being shot by the warden himself. Despite winning the tournament, Boyka is not allowed to go free because the guards have not found Turbo. Because Boyka was responsible for his escape, the arrangement is that Turbo will remain free while Boyka will be transferred back to his original prison, to which Boyka responds that he does not care — he has proven his point. Like the other prisoners, Boyka is instead taken out to be shot, but he is rescued at the last minute by Turbo. The duo retreat to a waiting car where Gaga sits with a suitcase of money. He reveals that he always knew Boyka was the best fighter in the world, especially when he was angry, so he bet all of his money on him all along and deceived the other managers — even going so far as to rescue and hide Turbo when he escaped. Boyka decides to part ways, finally revealing his first name, Yuri, to Turbo. In turn, Turbo confesses that his real name is "Jericho," not realizing that Boyka has a special appreciation for religious references. In gratitude, he thanks Turbo for "bringing down the walls" and setting him free. Turbo then requests a match with Boyka in future and Boyka accepts. As the car leaves, Boyka happily walks with the money filled briefcase toward freedom laughing joyfully.

Cast

Release

Theatrical
It was released in the United States on June 1, 2010.

Reception

Box office
The film grossed $282,548 in Lebanon and United Arab Emirates.

Critical response
James Marsh of Screen Anarchy praised Florentine's direction for capturing the "flow and [the] combinations" of the "innovative, exciting and technically groundbreaking battles" and his cast of charismatic action stars, singling out Zaror for having "a natural eye-catching screen quality that's hard to ignore", concluding that: "[A]s someone who normally demands genuine drama from real characters along with his martial arts, I was overpowered, overwhelmed and left battered and bleeding at the total mercy of this movie. Resistance is futile. Undisputed 3: Redemption rules." Bill Gibron of DVD Talk gave note of the film being "simplified cinema set up to achieve certain stock goals", concluding that: "Undisputed III promises nothing more than a series of well filmed beatdowns, and delivers on every account. It might not be rocket science, but it's not Rocky either. Instead of finesse, all we get here is fighting - and that's perfectly fine."

Accolades
Undisputed III won Best Director Award and Best Fight Choreographer in the 2010 edition of ActionFest.

Sequel

According to Movie Cricket, Adkins confirmed that there will be a fourth installment to the Undisputed series. On May 29, 2014, When asked whether there would be an Undisputed 4, Adkins replied, "Yes, it is definitely something we are pursuing. We are working on the script at the moment trying to get all the departments happy with what we are trying to do. It’s taking longer than I want to be honest but you know it is difficult financing these films. In this day and age those type of straight to DVD films don’t make the sort of money they used to make in the 90s/early 2000s. So it is a bit of a precarious business at the moment and that is why it is taking so long but we are definitely all trying to get it going because we appreciate what following that character of Boyka has and you know, I love playing that character and I can’t wait to return to him and we’ve got some good ideas on where to take the character."

Production had begun on Boyka: Undisputed in June 2015 with Scott Adkins returning as Boyka. The plot involves the fighter, who is now free, attempting to go as a professional fighter when he accidentally kills someone in the ring. However, to make amends for what he has done, he must engage in a series of fights to save the wife of the man he killed. Shooting was completed in early August 2015 for a 2017 release date.

References

External links

2010 films
2010 action films
2010 direct-to-video films
2010 martial arts films
2010s American films
2010s English-language films
American independent films
American martial arts films
American prison films
Direct-to-video sequel films
Films directed by Isaac Florentine
Films set in Georgia (country)
Films set in Russia
Films shot in Bulgaria
Martial arts tournament films
Mixed martial arts films
Underground fighting films
Undisputed (film series)